US Education Fair Moscow is the first social-oriented and non-commercial exhibition project covering all the segments of US education ― from K-12 to higher. The project takes place in Moscow.

Mission 
To improve competitiveness of Russian managerial personnel, help find fresh knowledge and ideas in humanities and technological areas, to provide additional impetus to the development of cultural and educational exchange between Russia and the United States, thereby strengthening bonds of collaboration and trust shared by those two countries.

The organizer 
Moskau Messe Exhibition Company

The venue 
One of the most storied exhibition grounds in Moscow, Sokolniki Exhibition and Convention Centre located in the like-named park, will serve as the event's venue.

It is particularly fitting that in 1959 Sokolniki was the site for the first exhibition in Russia dedicated to American industrial production.

About the project 
Special non-commercial exposition American Education Area including some thematic zones to be organized within the framework of the exhibition:

 US Education Geography: Colleges and Universities
 English testing area
 American student communities
 US education: history
 The Ivy League
 50 Top American Universities
 Webcast zone (where prospective students may ask US education representatives any questions on-line).

References 

Trade fairs in Russia
Russian-American history